Theodore Townsend Purdy (born August 15, 1973) is an American professional golfer. He has won one PGA Tour tournament, the 2005 EDS Byron Nelson Championship. He has also won on the Nationwide Tour and the Asian Tour.

Early life 
Purdy was born in Phoenix, Arizona. He graduated from Brophy College Preparatory in 1992. He went to the University of Arizona as a finance major and was inducted into its Sports Hall of Fame in 2005.

Professional career 
In 2007 he finished just outside the top 125 on the PGA Tour money list, and lost full playing rights for the 2008 season. He returned to the PGA Tour for 2009 through qualifying school. He has alternated between the PGA Tour and Nationwide Tour since 2010. After Purdy's PGA Tour career stalled, he became a representative for a custom car company. In 2013, Purdy earned his first professional win in eight years at the Abierto Mexicano de Golf on PGA Tour Latinoamérica, two steps below the PGA Tour. It was his fourth professional win in four different tours. He has since resumed playing on a more frequent basis, though on the Web.com Tour and third-tier Gateway Tour. Purdy reached the final rounds of 2013 and 2014 Web.com Tour Qualifying School, but was not able to maintain his tour privileges and plays occasionally through Monday qualifying and Past Champion status.

In 2013, at the time of his resurging pro golf career, Purdy developed a grip aid that was named one of the top ten items at the 2014 PGA Merchandise Show. Purdy's swing coach is Pam Barnett.

Personal life
Purdy is married with two children.

Professional wins (4)

PGA Tour wins (1)

PGA Tour playoff record (0–1)

Asian Tour wins (1)

Nationwide Tour wins (1)

Nationwide Tour playoff record (1–0)

PGA Tour Latinoamérica wins (1)

Results in major championships

CUT = missed the half-way cut
"T" = tied

Results in The Players Championship

CUT = missed the halfway cut
"T" indicates a tie for a place

Results in World Golf Championships

DQ = disqualified

See also
1998 PGA Tour Qualifying School graduates
2003 Nationwide Tour graduates
2008 PGA Tour Qualifying School graduates

References

External links
 
 PurdyGrip website (tedpurdy.com)
 
 

American male golfers
Arizona Wildcats men's golfers
PGA Tour golfers
PGA Tour Latinoamérica golfers
Korn Ferry Tour graduates
Golfers from Phoenix, Arizona
1973 births
Living people